Renmin Street Subdistrict or Renminjie Subdistrict may refer to these subdistricts in China:

Renmin Street Subdistrict, Zhumadian, Henan
Renmin Street Subdistrict, Xining, Qinghai

See also
Renmin Road Subdistrict (disambiguation)
Renmin Subdistrict (disambiguation)